Akala Garrett (born May 10, 2005) is an American track and field athlete. She won gold medals at the 2022 World Junior Championships in the 400 metres hurdles and the 4 × 400 m relay.

Personal life
Garrett attended Harding University High School in Charlotte, North Carolina. She is coached by her mother, former track athlete LaSonja Collins.

Career
Garrett was the Gatorade's North Carolina Girls Track & Field Player of the Year in 2021, and 2022. She won the 100m hurdles and the 400m hurdles at the 2022 USATF U20 Outdoor Championships at Hayward Field in Eugene, Oregon, running 10.91 for the 100 m hurdles and 57.47 for the 400 m hurdles. She had won the 400 m hurdles the year previously also.

She won the 2022 World Junior Championships in the 400 m hurdles and dedicated the win to her former high school principal, Eric Ward. Her time of 56.16 was a world leading U20 time. She finished half a second ahead of nearest rival, Hanna Karlsson of Sweden. She doubled up and also won gold in the 4x400 m relay at the event in Cali, Colombia.

References

External links

2005 births
Living people
Track and field athletes from North Carolina
American female hurdlers
World Athletics U20 Championships winners
21st-century American women